Mallanum Mathevanum is a 1976 Indian Malayalam-language film, directed and produced by Kunchacko. The film stars Prem Nazir, KP Ummer, Sheela, Adoor Bhasi, Jayan and Thikkurissy Sukumaran Nair in the lead roles. The film has musical score by K. Raghavan and Kumarakam Rajappan.

Cast
 
Prem Nazir
K. P. Ummer
Jayan
Sheela 
Adoor Bhasi 
Thikkurissy Sukumaran Nair 
Unnimary 
Janardanan  
Master Raghu 
Rani Chandra

Soundtrack
The music was composed by K. Raghavan and Kumarakam Rajappan.

References

External links
 

1976 films
1970s Malayalam-language films